Sagus Kul lizard (Phrynocephalus erythrurus) is a species of agamid lizard endemic to China. This species is adapted to extremely high altitudes and can be found at elevation of 4500-5300m.

References

erythrurus
Reptiles of China
Endemic fauna of China
Reptiles described in 1909
Taxa named by Erich Zugmayer